Biegun is a surname. Notable people with the surname include:

Halina Biegun (born 1955), Polish luger
Krzysztof Biegun (born 1994), Polish ski jumper
Stefania Biegun (1935–2016), Polish cross-country skier
Stephen E. Biegun (born 1963), American auto executive and politician

See also
 

Polish-language surnames